ArtRave: The Artpop Ball (stylized as artRAVE: the ARTPOP ball) was the fourth headlining concert tour by American singer Lady Gaga. Supporting her third studio album Artpop (2013), the tour ran from May 4, 2014 to November 24, 2014. The tour dates included cities where Gaga had canceled shows of her previous Born This Way Ball tour after suffering a hip injury. The ArtRave tour was preceded by a performance at the South by Southwest music festival, which drew controversy due to a segment where an artist vomited on Gaga, and a seven-day residency at the Roseland Ballroom in Manhattan, New York.

ArtRave's concept and name are derived from the similarly named release party for Artpop. The stage resembled a cave and consisted of two sections connected by catwalks made of translucent lucite, allowing the audience to move underneath the catwalks while still being able to watch the show. Gaga's costumes in the show included one with tentacles, one with bejeweled wings, a rave-inspired outfit and a necklace made of marijuana leaves. Costume designers and choreographers aspired to make a single, coherent show. The lighting fixtures used for the concert were from Clay Paky and the main idea was to create an immersive rave experience with the lights. They were also designed to accommodate minor changes in the show sequences.

The tour was produced by Live Nation, and promoted by Absolut Vodka in the United States and O2 in the United Kingdom. Tickets for several shows sold out immediately once available, prompting additional dates. Negative reports about the tour's commercial performance were dismissed by Live Nation chairman Arthur Fogel. Gaga repeatedly placed within the top-ten of the Billboard Boxscore lists for the 2014 tour grosses. At the end, ArtRave: The Artpop Ball grossed a total of $83 million from 920,088 sold tickets at the 74 reported performances. Billboard also listed it as the ninth best concert tour of the year with 76 reported shows. The tour additionally received positive response from reviewers, but some criticized it for being disjointed. On November 24, 2014, the concert was streamed live from Bercy Arena in France.

Background 

While releasing her third studio album Artpop, Gaga held a private event in New York known as ArtRave, where she performed songs from the album and showcased art pieces. Later, she took the concept of ArtRave and created ArtRave: The Artpop Ball tour. After abruptly cancelling the North American leg of her previous Born This Way Ball (2012–13) tour due to a major hip injury, the tour began with its first leg in the United States on May 4, 2014, in Fort Lauderdale, Florida. ArtRave: The Artpop Ball had the singer visiting cities where she canceled tour dates in order to undergo the surgery, as well as playing new cities. Gaga explained to The Independent: "When I'm onstage with the Artpop Ball, the point of the show is to take what was the mess of my life and make art of it – to raise the spirit of artistic dreams and creativity and take all the things I was feeling in pain about, and rage... I take a much more meditative approach to the performance. I've got wide-open ears. The ArtRave has routines, and there's a performance-art aspect that has been designed." Prior to the beginning of the tour, Gaga headlined six shows (March 28, 30, 31 and April 2, 4, and 6) at the Roseland Ballroom in Manhattan, New York, and these shows were the final performances at the venue. A seventh show was also added for April 7 and officially closed the venue.

Gaga also held a one-off concert for ArtRave: The Artpop Ball inside a six-storey vending machine at Doritos' annual South by Southwest (SXSW) music festival at Austin, Texas. The city's Music and Entertainment division had initially denied permission to Gaga for playing inside the venue citing that it was for "public safety concerns". Don Pitts from the division said that the venue being in close proximity with a parking lot was the reason they had to cancel Gaga's application. On March 6, 2014, it was announced that Gaga would indeed play at the venue. Tickets were sold to the fans through different competitions and challenges. Randal Lane from Forbes reported that the concert would support Gaga's Born This Way Foundation and charity events, but nevertheless opined that "the way they're doling out the tickets is still crass". The concert was criticized when artist Millie Brown vomited a green liquid over Gaga during the performance of "Swine" from Artpop. The performance received complaints about "glamorizing" eating disorders. In response to the controversy, Brown told MTV News: "I can understand why people would make that association, but my performance is really not a statement about eating disorders themselves." Gaga herself told Today "Millie and I know that not everybody's going to love that performance, but we both really believe in artistic expression and strong identities, and I support her and what she does. Artpop, my new album, is about bringing art and music together in the spirit of creative rebellion, and for us, that performance was art in its purest form."

Development

Stage setup 

For the tour, Gaga told Capital FM that she wanted something other than the "Monster Pit" arrangement she previously had in the Born This Way Ball tour, since she was always limited to performing on one portion of the arena. Hence Gaga and her team thought of building two stages, one main stage and an accompanying one on the far end of the arena. It would be enhanced by the addition of a catwalk which would wind all around the arena floor, enabling the singer to interact with the audience. In March 2014, Gaga tweeted a picture of the stage which showed a runway extending from the main platform up to the general admission seats and then bifurcating into two additional runways, ending in small stages within the audience. At the end of the first runway, another platform was constructed which descended into the crowd directly. The main stage was described as a white cave, reminiscent of Atlantica from the 1989 Disney film The Little Mermaid, and featured a digital backdrop showing stars and the moon.

The band was placed inside the white dome like structures on the stage, described by John Jurgenson from The Wall Street Journal as like the planet Tatooine in the Star Wars series. At the end of one of the Lucite runways, a piano was hidden beneath enormous stalagmite-like structures reminiscent of Superman's Fortress of Solitude in the comics. There was also a bar overlooking the piano area, where the audience could order drinks while watching the show. Carl Williot from Idolator website compared the stage with that of ArtRave, and felt that it looked like an "insect" with the extended runway and smaller stages. Following the reveal of the image, the hashtag #LadyGagaTourStage started trending globally in Twitter. According to Stacy Lambe from Out magazine, the stage took over 21,000 hours to construct, including the catwalks. There are 15 inflatable trees which are air hosed on the stage to re-create a garden during one of the segments. The whole set up took three hours to dismantle and 21 trucks to carry it from one venue to another. Production manager Jason "JD" Danter explained that the whole set up started from 8:00 am, with lighting and sound checks taking six hours to complete.

For the production of the show, Gaga enlisted choreographer Richard Jackson and together with him and her creative team, the Haus of Gaga, they came up with ideas regarding how the show should be constructed and what music should be performed. They also had to find a way to co-mingle all the different ideas to make a single, coherent show. For the choreography, which encompassed all the stages present, Jackson had to employ a different approach, so that the audience could see the performance from every angle.

Costume design 

Gaga did not preview the costumes for the tour until the opening night. There were seven outfits created for the show, all throughout the different segments. The first was a bejeweled leotard which had the Jeff Koons blue gazing ball attached in the middle; the ball was previously used in the album cover art for Artpop. Gaga accessorized the dress with a pair of feathered wings while wearing a blond bob wig reminiscent of her looks from The Fame era. A rave inspired outfit was worn for the last segment and consisted of colorful dreadlocks and legwarmers made of fur. She added a shirt consisting of straps and plastic sleeves with it. One of the complex outfits was made of latex and consisted of a polka dotted leotard and a number of tentacles attached to the dress as well as a headpiece with two tentacles from it.

The singer also wore a short dress coupled with a platinum bob wig; another version of the dress had a gown attached to it, with Gaga wearing a long wig inspired by Donatella Versace. Before the final performance Gaga wore black latex pants and a top, with a green wig on her head and a necklace made of marijuana leaves. Finally, Gaga also wore a seashell bikini top and voluminous wig; the ensemble had been worn by Gaga in previous live performances for the Artpop era. Her dancers wore neon colored outfits with matching head gears and accessories. Gaga also had a number of unique props, including a Gibson Flying V guitar during "Venus", a plastic chair shaped like a claw and a keytar which was shaped like a sea horse.

BBC News reported that some of the costumes for the tour were designed by Sunderland University fashion graduate Dayne Henderson. He had been chosen by one of Gaga's stylists after seeing his tweet to the singer with a photo of his design which included clothing inspired by fetish fashion. Henderson developed hoods, masks and head pieces for Gaga and her dancers. He had to produce the clothes in latex, and within 12 days had to deliver it to Gaga's management.

Lighting fixtures 
Production and lighting designer Roy Bennett used Clay Paky's A.leda B-Eye K20 LED-based moving lights and Clay Paky Sharpys as lighting attachments. Also around 120 B-Eyes by PKG, were obtained for the tour as well with lighting control from three full-sized grandMA2s and 10 NPUs. According to lighting programmer Jason Baeri, "Bennett's approach to the show was to make it an immersive rave that reflected Gaga's non-stop party aesthetic... That means active, alive, vibrant and high energy—it requires us to be just as active on stage as in the crowd. The audience is every bit as much a set piece as they are a room of spectators, so we had to include them as part of Gaga's same party not just watching the spectacle from afar. Cue wise, that's almost like programming two shows at once: Both had to behave as one cohesive element."

Bennett had started designing the lighting from November 2013 and three months later presented it to Gaga. She approved off the audience experience theme that Bennett developed. The B-Eyes, which were previously used in the Roseland shows, were mounted above the  video screens in the tour. Sharpy rigging were used throughout, in the front of the stage, rear, side, as well as on the pods over the audience. They were the main lighting accessory for the tour. Baeri explained that they had faced technical challenges, due to high pixel content. The B-Eyes added a total of 4,500 pixel and was varied through all possible configurations. The lighting effects varied along with the tone and the inflections of the song being performed. Clay Paky was distributed by A.C.T Lighting in North America. Solotech were signed as the video contractor, while 8th Day Sound group were the audio contractors throughout the tour.

Concert synopsis 

The show starts off with a video introduction about the tour, followed by dancers appearing on stage with balloons and blue gazing balls. The video continues to play as Gaga emerges from beneath the stage, wearing a golden leotard with wings. She proceeds to sing "Artpop" and then "G.U.Y.", the latter having choreography from its music video. The song transitions to "Donatella" with the screen showing flashing stars and colorful cloud formations. Gaga then performs "Fashion!" on the piano and goes back for a costume change as the band plays the remaining part of the song.

The next section starts with "Venus" as large inflatable flowers rise from below on stage. Gaga appears in the seashell bikini ensemble and playing a guitar. After a welcome speech, "MANiCURE" and "Cake Like Lady Gaga" are performed. Gaga disappears inside for another outfit change as the band plays an outro. She emerges back onto stage in the white outfit and wig as a video shows her twirling on screen. "Just Dance" is sung, with Gaga using a seahorse-shaped keytar and her dancers dressed as "sea people". It is followed by a medley of "Poker Face" and "Telephone". The act ends with Gaga exiting for a costume change and "Partynauseous" is played as an interlude.

The fourth act begins with Gaga wearing the tentacle dress and singing "Paparazzi". She then removes the tentacles and sits on a hand-shaped chair, performing "Do What U Want", followed by Gaga singing "Dope" and "You and I" on piano. Later, Gaga invites a fan onstage and sings a piano version of "Born This Way". She and the fan exit through a trap down as "Jewels n' Drugs" is played as an interlude.

As dancers move props and cannons around the stage, Gaga changes a black latex dress and green wig. She returns to stage and sings a medley of "The Edge of Glory", "Judas", and "Aura", beginning the fifth act. A red couch is brought out on which "Sexxx Dreams" is sung. Following this, white chairs are brought out onto the stage by the dancers for "Mary Jane Holland", during which a choreography is shown with the chairs. "Alejandro" takes place on the lucite runways. At the end of the song, Gaga descends for a quick change. The fifth act triggers when she arises in a Cher-like outfit, singing "Bang Bang (My Baby Shot Me Down)". Gaga then performs "Bad Romance" in a rave-inspired costume, followed by "Applause", during which a video backdrop shows the singer in various disguises. Gaga bids the audience goodbye and sings "Swine", during which her dancers fire stuffed animals into the crowd using cannon. During the performance, Gaga removes her wig and dances with shirtless men in pig masks. She leaves the stage for a final costume change, appearing to perform "Gypsy" for the encore. Near the end, she crosses to the main stage and exits with her dancers and band.

Commercial performance

Ticket sales 

The tickets were first available to members of Gaga's social network website, Littlemonsters.com. They were provided with a unique code for ordering tickets from online, but were limited to four tickets per member. According to Live Nation, the first batch of tickets for the tour went on sale from December 9, 2013, and sell-out shows were reported from Toronto, Winnipeg, Calgary, Los Angeles and Edmonton within hours. This led to two new dates being added to the itinerary: June 26 at Milwaukee's Marcus Amphitheater, and June 28 at Atlantic City's Boardwalk Hall. On January 29, 2014, Gaga released the dates for the European leg of the tour, which would begin September 23, 2014, from Belgium. The singer partnered with British mobile network O2, for a deal which would enable the company's customers to avail tickets for the tour three days prior to the general release. The deal included Gaga being featured in a new advertisement, for promoting the UK leg of the tour and showed her wearing a dress with large, glittering shoulder pads while running towards a concert stage. This was the second time Gaga partnered with O2, first in November 2013, for exclusive access to the tracks from Artpop, ahead of its UK release. Upon release, Ticketmaster reported that the UK venues sold out within five minutes, prompting the singer to add another two dates in London. In April and May 2014, she released more floor tickets for sale, after ensuring larger crowd capacity for all the UK venues and a total of eight new dates.

For the US dates, Gaga partnered with Absolut Vodka, who transformed the bar adjacent to the stage into a lounge called "Absolut Artpop Lounge", where some of the lucky fans could watch the show, while ordering cocktails of their choice. Two fans would be chosen on the spot to have seats at the bar; tickets could also be won through a contest at the Absolut website. Gaga explained that with the help of Absolut she could "[create] a special experience where fans can actually sit inside the stage and have their own bar. It's going to be a huge rave in the spirit of art and creativity." Other promotions announced at the website included winning an all-expense-paid trip to see Gaga's show on September 30 at Stockholm, Sweden, and Gaga-inspired runway shows at LGBT bars across the nation, from where another set of tickets could be won. Four dates were added in Australia, starting from August 20, 2014, at Perth. She had one concert at Dubai's Meydan Racecourse on September 10, but newspaper Gulf News reported that the show would be censored for respecting cultural traditions in the UAE. According to Marco Riois, chairman of AMI Live which organized the show in Dubai, "there will be some edits... It cannot be the full show, because it wouldn't be allowed. So it's a special show for Dubai and for the culture".

Boxscore 

Forbes spoke about the commendable ticket pricing ensued by Live Nation for the tour. Jesse Lawrence from the magazine noticed how the ticket prices were lowered to an average of $68 in Gaga's primary markets and ensuing fast sell-outs, compared to those of her contemporaries, like Miley Cyrus' Bangerz Tour which had an average ticket price at $86. Conversely, the average price was raised to as high as $269 in Gaga's secondary markets, although with fewer tickets available than Cyrus' tour. This again ensued that the revenue was earned with profit. Lawrence concluded by saying that "Lady Gaga's pricing, seems to be taking a longer-term view and is focused on providing access to as many of her fans as possible as opposed to wringing out every last dollar on the current tour." In April 2014, Lawrence reported that following Gaga's performance at Roseland Ballroom, the tour ticket prices in the secondary markets went up by 5.3%, with major increases being visible at Philips Arena in Atlanta. Tickets at Madison Square Garden rose up to $338.81, which was 42.6% higher than the average price. Other locations where ticket prices saw an increase were MGM Grand Garden Arena in Las Vegas, TD Garden Arena in Boston and United Center in Chicago. A higher price was set for the first of two nights at Staples Center in Los Angeles, resulting in one of the costliest tickets in the show. The pricing was leveled off for the second night and they gradually decreased with the tour's progress. This was evident in the tour date switch up between May 12 and 15 at Washington and Philadelphia, respectively, where the ticket prices fell by 29.5%.

Reports arose in the media that the ticket sales for the tour were falling, leading Arthur Fogel, Chairman of Live Nation's Global Touring division, to brand them as "ridiculous". He clarified to Billboard that the about 80% of the tickets were sold in North America and Europe, and they were still in the process of releasing future dates for numerous venues. The 29 shows in North America had grossed around US$26 million, with an average of almost $900,000 per show. Fogel also addressed concerns that Live Nation had lost $30 million from Gaga's tour, saying that if a similar situation really happened, then the company would have cancelled the concerts. "I just don't know how this shit gets any traction without people doing their homework... Just a complete fool would say something like that and it could only come from somebody who has an agenda, because it makes absolutely no sense, on any level", Fogel concluded. A total of 800,000 tickets have been sold for the tour, as reported by Billboard.

In June 2014, Billboard released the first boxscore figures for the tour, up to the June 2 date. Gaga placed at number four on the boxscore list with total gross of $13.9 million, and more than 171,000 tickets sold. The boxscore figure for her Roseland Ballroom performance was also revealed to have grossed $1.5 million with more than 24,000 tickets sold. In October 2014, the second set of boxscore were released, with sales of 509,741 tickets and a gross of $46,933,594, ranking at number two on the boxscore list. Final boxscores were released in December 2014, with the last performance at Paris' Palais Omnisports Bercy grossing $1.2 million and audience of 13,013. In total, ArtRave: The Artpop Ball grossed $83 million from 920,088 sold tickets at the 74 reported performances to Billboard Boxscore. On Pollstars Year-end Top 20 Worldwide Tours list, Gaga ranked at number seven with $88.7 million in gross and 947,852 tickets sold for 84 shows, including the seven shows from Roseland Ballroom. Billboard listed it as the ninth best concert tour of the year with 76 reported shows.

Critical response

North America 

John Walker from MTV News reviewed the opening concert in Fort Lauderdale, and was impressed with the show. He particularly liked the segment, when after the performance of "Alejandro", Gaga decided to change her costume onstage and did so with the help of her stylists. Walker added that "to prove this, [Gaga] ripped the green, shoulder-length wig right off of her head. Yes, she literally snatched her own wig. Reverse Warholian expedition says what?" Walker further emphasized in another review for MTV that the tour expanded on Gaga's characteristic "fan-to-artist" connections and theatrics she had developed with the Born This Way Ball. Adam Carlson from Billboard praised the show saying that it turned the "spectacle" into a "surprise". He complimented the choreography and the constant costume changes, explaining that "talking about [Gaga's] performances is more fun than listening to them, but don't take that as an insult. There's just a lot to talk about." Chris Richards from The Washington Post said that "for a pop concert in an arena [Verizon Center], it felt good. As a public exercise in reciprocal, unconditional love, it felt unique [from Gaga]."

Glenn Gamboa from Newsday was impressed with the performances, saying "Whether it was the goofiness of 'Venus', the playfulness of 'Donatella' or the throwback soul of 'Do What U Want', which she crowned with an a cappella bit of gospel, she filled the songs with an intensity that was infectious." Lauren Moraski from CBS News felt that Gaga was in "full-force" during the concert and "seemed right at home" with the New York crowd. Frank Scheck from The Hollywood Reporter commended the stage setup, the costumes and the overall entertainment aspect of the tour, saying that "Unlike Madonna, who engages in similar, but decidedly chillier, over-the-top theatrics, Gaga invests her spectacles with an undeniable sweetness and heart." Scheck was positive about the performances of "Gypsy" and "Born This Way".

Negative commentary came from Rob Sheffield of Rolling Stone who reviewed the show at Madison Square Garden and was disappointed, calling it "a run-of-the-mill arena-rock show, the kind where a band has a shoddy new album to flog". He was not impressed that Gaga chose to ignore songs from Born This Way and its successful singles. Dan DeLuca from Philadelphia Daily News wrote that "the show was seriously marred by too many electro powered would-be dance cuts from ARTPOP whose weaknesses were exposed whenever she reached back to her more enticing greatest hits" and that she performed "far too many songs" from Artpop. The Boston Globe writer James Reed felt that "something" was missing from Gaga's performance, and it felt "hollow". He also criticized Gaga's reliance on backing tracks to sing her songs. Joey Guerra from Houston Chronicle found the show to be "disjointed", saying that there was "little in the way of real transition between sequences, particularly in the later moments."

Oceania, Asia, and Europe 

Candice Barnes from The Sydney Morning Herald gave the show positive review, saying that Gaga "delivered a show fit for a queen" at Perth Arena. "Plugged as an 'art rave', it was hard to distinguish where the art finished and the music began", she concluded. Conversely, Ross McCrae from The West Australian panned the show calling it "middle of the road arena rock show", and noticed the public's lack of interest in the performances. The lack of ticket sales was also noted by a reviewer for News.com.au, who went on to add that "one could never accuse Lady Gaga of lacking attention to detail in her live productions or failing to put in a wholehearted and energetic performance." Jenny Valentish from Time Out awarded the show in Melbourne five stars, calling Gaga "a phenomenal singer with an immense voice (...) who could try her hand at any genre", also praising her live band and the costume changes.

The National critic Saeed Saeed described the show as "hugely entertaining" and something that "delivers pop music's ultimate mandate: to dance your worries away". Writing about the subdued concert in Dubai due to religious sentiments, Mohammed Kadry from Khaleej Times noted that Gaga could still put on a "spectacle" and she "was determined to connect with her local audience as she attempted to piece together flattering colloquial phrases". Debra Kamin from The Times of Israel praised Gaga's vocals, adding that "show was everything Gaga promised and everything fans have come to expect from her — loud, sexually explicit and mind-numbingly bright."

Dave Simpson from The Guardian gave a positive review for the Birmingham concert, awarding the show with 4 out of 5 stars. He stated that "Gaga has often been accused of being all artifice and no heart, but tonight's show is a powerful statement from a star who refuses to be pinned down or written off." Daniel Dylan Wray from The Independent awarded the Birmingham concert with 4 out of 5 stars and described ArtRave as "loud, colourful and frequently emblematic of feel-good, throwaway party times". Katie Fitzpatrick from Manchester Evening News awarded the concert with 5 out of 5 stars. She praised Lady Gaga's voice, her live band, the outfits and the connection of the fans – especially in this show that Gaga helped a fan to propose to his partner on stage. Katie stated that "the ostentatiously named ArtRave may reaffirm that Gaga the show-woman is definitely about her art. But this little lady with the powerful set of lungs is also undoubtedly all heart." Ludovic Hunter-Tilney from the Financial Times rated the concert three out of five stars. He criticized the songs from Artpop except the title track, but complimented the acoustic and piano sequences.

Broadcast and recording 
On November 17, 2014, Gaga announced through her social medias that the last concert show, which took place at Bercy Arena in France on November 24, would be streamed live around the world, online on Yahoo! Live. The concert started with a 30-minute video presentation of Gaga's portraits, as shot by Robert Wilson, and which were previously exhibited at the Louvre Museum in Paris. The live stream broke records for Yahoo! Live and Live Nation.

Set list 
This set list is from the show in Newcastle, England, on November 22, 2014. It is not intended to represent all tour dates.

 "Artpop"
 "G.U.Y."
 "Donatella"
 "Venus"
 "Manicure"
 "Just Dance"
 "Poker Face" / "Telephone"
 "Paparazzi"
 "Do What U Want"
 "Dope"
 "You and I"
 "Born This Way"
 "Jewels 'n Drugs" 
 "The Edge of Glory" 
 "Judas" / "Aura"
 "Sexxx Dreams"
 "Mary Jane Holland"
 "Alejandro"
 "Bang Bang (My Baby Shot Me Down)"
 "Bad Romance"
 "Applause"
 "Swine"
Encore
"Gypsy"

Shows

Personnel 
Personnel taken from ArtRave: The Artpop Ball tour book.

Management

Live Nation Global Touring (Worldwide) – promoter (Worldwide)
MAC Cosmetics – tour sponsor (Worldwide) 
Absolut Vodka (US), O2 (UK) – tour sponsor
Bobby Campbell at Haus of Gaga – management
Lane Bentley at Haus of Gaga – Day-to-day management
Vincent Herbert for Streamline – manager
 Mary Jo Spillane – road manager
Ky Cabot – tour manager
Peter van der Veen – personal security
Kevin Bernal – personal security
Robert Marshall – personal security

Main personnel

Lady Gaga – main performer
Richard "Richie" Jackson – visual director, choreographer
Brandon Maxwell – fashion director
Roy Bennett – production, lighting designer
Michael Bearden – musical director
Lacee Franks – creative co-ordinator
Alexander Delgado – art director
Vincent Herbert – manager for Streamline
Sonja Durham – managing director, Haus of Gaga
Ashley Gutierrez – personal assistant
Tara Savelo – make-up
Frederic Aspiras – hair stylist
Perry Meek – costume designer
Sandra Amador – stylist
Mary Jo Spillane – road manager
Peter van der Been – personal security
Robert Marshall – personal security
Sarah Nicole Tanno – dancers and band's make up artist
Travisean Haynes – dancers and band hair stylist
David Odom – physical therapist
Asiel Hardison at Haus of Gaga – dance captain
Graham Breitenstein – dancer
Karen Chuang – dancer
Montana Efaw – dancer
Kevin Frey – dancer
Nick Geurts – dancer
David Masterson – dancer
Ian McKenzie – dancer
Tamina Pollack-Paris – dancer
Sloan-Taylor Rabinor – dancer
Victor Rojas – dancer
Gianinni Semedo Moreira – dancer
Theresa Stone – dancer
China Taylor – dancer
Brockett Parsons – keyboards
George "Spanky" McCurdy – drums
Lanar "Kern" Brantley – bass
Ricky Tillo – guitar
Tim Stewart – guitar
Lady Gaga – guitar and keyboard/piano (on "Venus"), keytar (on "Just Dance"), piano/keyboard (on "Dope", "You and I" and "Born This Way")
LeRoy Bennett – production designer, lighting designer
Whitney Hoversten – lighting director
Jason Baeri – lighting programmer
Oli James  – lighting tech (crew chief)
Alex Peters – lighting tech
Mark Pritchard – lighting tech
Mike Rothwell – lighting tech
Leif Le Page – lighting tech
James Jones III – lighting tech
Matt "Skinny" Le Roux – lighting tech
Chris Bartlett – lighting tech
Jason Danter – production manager
Alicia Geist - production coordinator
Ky Cabot – tour manager
Brian Wares – stage manager
Chris Organ – stage manager/show caller
Lisa Bruno - head of wardrobe
Bert Pare – video director
Tim Brennan – video engineer
Loren Barton – video programmer
Vincent Cadieux  – video tech (crew chief)
Maxime Dube-Morais – video tech
Erin Lynch – video tech
Patrick Vaillancourt – video tech
Eric Simard – Hippo Media server tech
Hayden Hale – laser operator and programmer
Reid Schulte-Deme – special effects tech (crew chief)
David Harkness – special effects tech
Robin Henry – automation operator and programmer
Todd Green – head carpenter
Lonnie Adams – carpenter
Kirk "Rockit" La Rocco – carpenter
Erin O'Brian – carpenter
Corey Proulx – carpenter
Ernie Wagner – carpenter
Scotty Waller – carpenter
Carl Young – carpenter
Ryan Snyder – carpenter
Mike Farese – head rigger
Danny Machado – rigger
Kenny "Skippy" Ruhman – rigger
Rick Wilmot – rigger

Notes

References

External links 

ArtRave: The Artpop Ball tour gifs MTV News
ArtRave: The Artpop Ball tour costumes E! Online
ArtRave: The Artpop Ball tour concert images Screen Design Works

2014 concert tours
Lady Gaga concert tours
Concert tours of North America
Concert tours of Asia
Concert tours of Oceania
Concert tours of Europe
Concert tours of the United States
Concert tours of Canada
Concert tours of Japan
Concert tours of South Korea
Concert tours of Australia
Concert tours of the United Arab Emirates
Concert tours of Belgium
Concert tours of the Netherlands
Concert tours of Denmark
Concert tours of Norway
Concert tours of Sweden
Concert tours of Germany
Concert tours of the United Kingdom
Concert tours of Ireland
Concert tours of France
Concert tours of Austria
Concert tours of Italy
Concert tours of Switzerland
Concert tours of Spain
Concert tours of Portugal